Peter Ackroyd  (born 5 October 1949) is an English biographer, novelist and critic with a specialist interest in the history and culture of London. For his novels about English history and culture and his biographies of, among others, William Blake, Charles Dickens, T. S. Eliot, Charlie Chaplin and Sir Thomas More, he won the Somerset Maugham Award and two Whitbread Awards. He is noted for the volume of work he has produced, the range of styles therein, his skill at assuming different voices, and the depth of his research.

He was elected a fellow of the Royal Society of Literature in 1984 and appointed a Commander of the Order of the British Empire in 2003.

Early life and education
Ackroyd was born in London and raised on a council estate in East Acton, in what he has described as a "strict" Roman Catholic household by his mother and grandmother, after his father disappeared from the family home. He first knew that he was gay when he was seven. He was educated at St. Benedict's, Ealing, and at Clare College, Cambridge, from which he graduated with a double first in English literature. In 1972, he was a Mellon fellow at Yale University.

Work
The result of his Yale fellowship was Notes for a New Culture, written when Ackroyd was only 22 and eventually published in 1976. The title, an echo of T. S. Eliot's Notes Towards the Definition of Culture (1948), was an early indication of Ackroyd's penchant for exploring and re-examining the works of other London-based writers. He worked at The Spectator magazine between 1973 and 1977 as literary editor and became joint managing editor in 1978, a position he held until 1982. He worked as chief book reviewer for The Times and was a frequent broadcaster on radio. Since 1984 he has been a fellow of the Royal Society of Literature.

His literary career began with poetry; his work in that field includes such works as London Lickpenny (1973) and The Diversions of Purley (1987). In 1982 he published The Great Fire of London, his first novel, which is a reworking of Charles Dickens' novel Little Dorrit. The novel set the stage for the long sequence of novels Ackroyd has produced since, all of which deal in some way with the complex interaction of time and space and what Ackroyd calls "the spirit of place". However, this transition to being a novelist was unexpected. In an interview with Patrick McGrath in 1989, Ackroyd said:

I enjoy it, I suppose, but I never thought I'd be a novelist. I never wanted to be a novelist. I can't bear fiction. I hate it. It's so untidy. When I was a young man I wanted to be a poet, then I wrote a critical book, and I don't think I even read a novel till I was about 26 or 27.

In his novels he often contrasts historical settings with present-day segments (e.g. The Great Fire of London, Hawksmoor, The House of Doctor Dee). Many of Ackroyd's novels are set in London and deal with the ever-changing, but at the same time stubbornly consistent nature of the city. Often this theme is explored through the city's artists, especially its writers: Oscar Wilde in The Last Testament of Oscar Wilde (1983), a fake autobiography of Wilde; Nicholas Hawksmoor, Sir Christopher Wren and Sir John Vanbrugh in Hawksmoor (1985); Thomas Chatterton and George Meredith in Chatterton (1987); John Dee in The House of Dr Dee (1993); Dan Leno, Karl Marx, George Gissing and Thomas De Quincey in Dan Leno and the Limehouse Golem (1994); John Milton in Milton in America (1996); Charles Lamb in The Lambs of London.

Hawksmoor, winner of both the Whitbread Novel Award and the Guardian Fiction Prize, was inspired by Iain Sinclair's poem "Lud Heat" (1975), which speculated on a mystical power from the positioning of the six churches Nicholas Hawksmoor built. The novel gives Hawksmoor a Satanical motive for the siting of his buildings, and creates a modern namesake, a policeman investigating a series of murders. Chatterton (1987), a similarly layered novel explores plagiarism and forgery and was shortlisted for the Booker Prize. London: The Biography is an extensive and thorough discussion of London through the ages. In 1994 he was interviewed about the London Psychogeographical Association in an article for The Observer, in which he remarked:I truly believe that there are certain people to whom or through whom the territory, the place, the past speaks. ... Just as it seems possible to me that a street or dwelling can materially affect the character and behaviour of the people who dwell in them, is it not also possible that within this city (London) and within its culture are patterns of sensibility or patterns of response which have persisted from the thirteenth and fourteenth centuries and perhaps even beyond?

In the sequence London: The Biography (2000), Albion: The Origins of the English Imagination (2002), and Thames: Sacred River (2007), Ackroyd has produced works of what he considers historical sociology. These books trace themes in London and English culture from the ancient past to the present, drawing again on his favoured notion of almost spiritual lines of connection rooted in place and stretching across time.

His fascination with London literary and artistic figures is also displayed in the sequence of biographies he has produced of Ezra Pound (1980), T. S. Eliot (1984), Charles Dickens (1990), William Blake (1995), Thomas More (1998), Geoffrey Chaucer (2004), William Shakespeare (2005), and J. M. W. Turner. The city itself stands astride all these works, as it does in the fiction. Ackroyd was forced to think of new methods of biography writing in T. S. Eliot when he was told he couldn't quote extensively from Eliot's poetry and unpublished letters.

From 2003 to 2005, Ackroyd wrote a six-book non-fiction series (Voyages Through Time), intended for readers as young as eight, his first work for children. The critically acclaimed series—described as "Not just sound-bite snacks for short attention spans, but unfolding feasts that leave you with a sense of wonder" by The Sunday Times is an extensive narrative of key periods in world history.

In a 2012 interview with Matthew Stadlen of the BBC, when asked the question, "Who do you think is the person who has made the biggest impact upon the life of this country ever?", Ackroyd said, "I think William Blake is the most powerful and most significant philosopher or thinker in the course of English history." In the same interview, when asked what fascinates him about London, he said he admired "its power, its majesty, its darkness, its shadows." When asked what he did outside of writing, he said, "I drink, that's about it."

Personal life
Ackroyd had a long-term relationship with Brian Kuhn, an American dancer he met while at Yale. After a nervous breakdown in the late 1980s, Ackroyd moved to Devon with Kuhn. However, Kuhn was then diagnosed with AIDS and died in 1994, after which Ackroyd moved back to London. In 1999, he suffered a heart attack and was placed in a medically induced coma for a week.

In a 2004 interview, Ackroyd said that he had not been in a relationship since Kuhn's death and was "very happy being celibate."

List of works

Poetry 
1971 Ouch! 
1973 London Lickpenny
1978 Country Life
1987 The Diversions of Purley and Other Poems

Fiction 
1982 The Great Fire of London
1983 The Last Testament of Oscar Wilde
1985 Hawksmoor
1987 Chatterton
1989 First Light
1992 English Music
1993 The House of Doctor Dee
1994 Dan Leno and the Limehouse Golem (also published as The Trial of Elizabeth Cree)
1996 Milton in America
1999 The Plato Papers
2000 The Mystery of Charles Dickens
2003 The Clerkenwell Tales
2004 The Lambs of London
2006 The Fall of Troy
2008 The Casebook of Victor Frankenstein
2009 The Canterbury Tales – A Retelling
2010 The Death of King Arthur: The Immortal Legend – A Retelling
2013 Three Brothers
2020 Mr Cadmus

Non-fiction
1976 Notes for a New Culture: An Essay on Modernism
1979 Dressing Up: Transvestism and Drag, the History of an Obsession
1980 Ezra Pound and His World
1984 T. S. Eliot
1987 Dickens' London: An Imaginative Vision
1989 Ezra Pound and his World (1989)
1990 Dickens
1991 Introduction to Dickens
1995 Blake
1998 The Life of Thomas More
2000 London: The Biography
2001 The Collection: Journalism, Reviews, Essays, Short Stories, Lectures
2002 Dickens: Public Life and Private Passion
2002 Albion: The Origins of the English Imagination
2003 The Beginning
2003 Illustrated London
2004 Escape From Earth
2004 Ancient Egypt
2004 Chaucer (Nan A. Talese, Doubleday: Ackroyd's Brief Lives)
2005 Shakespeare: The Biography
2005 Ancient Greece
2005 Ancient Rome
2006 J.M.W. Turner (Nan A. Talese, Doubleday: Ackroyd's Brief Lives)
2007 Thames: Sacred River
2008 Coffee with Dickens (with Paul Schlicke)
2008 Newton (Nan A. Talese, Doubleday: Ackroyd's Brief Lives)
2008 Poe: A Life Cut Short (Nan A. Talese, Doubleday: Ackroyd's Brief Lives)
2009 Venice: Pure City
2010 The English Ghost
2011 London Under
2011 The History of England, v.1 Foundation
2012 Wilkie Collins (Nan A. Talese, Doubleday: Ackroyd's Brief Lives)
2012 The History of England, v.2 Tudors
2014 The History of England, v.3 Civil War (also available as Rebellion: The History of England from James I to the Glorious Revolution)
2014 Charlie Chaplin
2015 Alfred Hitchcock
2016 The History of England, v.4 Revolution
2017 Queer City: Gay London from the Romans to the Present Day
2018 The History of England, v.5 Dominion
2021 The History of England, v.6 Innovation
2021 Introducing Swedenborg
2022 The Colours of London
2023 The English Actor: From Medieval to Modern

Television
2002 Dickens (BBC)
2004 London (BBC)
2006 The Romantics (BBC)
2007 London Visions (BBC)
2008 Peter Ackroyd's Thames (ITV)
2009 Peter Ackroyd's Venice (BBC)

Honours and awards
1984 Fellow of the Royal Society of Literature
1984 Heinemann Award (joint winner) for T. S. Eliot
1984 Somerset Maugham Award for The Last Testament of Oscar Wilde
1984 Whitbread Biography Award for T. S. Eliot
1985 Guardian Fiction Prize for Hawksmoor
1985 Whitbread Novel Award for Hawksmoor
1988 Booker Prize for Fiction – nomination (shortlist) for Chatterton
1998 James Tait Black Memorial Prize (for biography) for The Life of Thomas More
2001 South Bank Show Annual Award for Literature for London: The Biography
2003 British Book Awards Illustrated Book of the Year (Illustrated London shortlisted)
2003 Commander of the Most Excellent Order of the British Empire (CBE)
2006 Foreign Honorary Member of the American Academy of Arts and Sciences
2006 Honorary Doctor of Letters (D.Litt.) from Brunel University.

See also
 List of children's non-fiction writers

References

Citations

Sources

External links

 
 
 
 
 
 Peter Ackroyd Papers. General Collection, Beinecke Rare Book and Manuscript Library, Yale University.

1949 births
Alumni of Clare College, Cambridge
Fellows of the Royal Society of Literature
English biographers
English children's writers
English historians
English historical novelists
Commanders of the Order of the British Empire
Living people
People educated at St Benedict's School, Ealing
People from Acton, London
Psychogeographers
Chaucer scholars
Fellows of the American Academy of Arts and Sciences
Postmodern writers
English gay writers
Costa Book Award winners
James Tait Black Memorial Prize recipients
William Blake scholars
20th-century English novelists
21st-century British novelists
People from the London Borough of Hammersmith and Fulham
English LGBT poets
English LGBT novelists
20th-century biographers
21st-century biographers
Historians of London